Southern Pride was a steam-powered whaler built by the Smiths Dock Company of Middlesbrough in 1936. She was the initial design inspiration for the s used to escort convoys in the North Atlantic in World War II. The final design for the Flower class was significantly modified from that of Southern Pride factoring in things like ease of construction.

After World War II began Southern Pride was requisitioned by the Royal Navy, and converted into a warship.  Her conversion took six weeks and cost 75,000 pounds. She was wrecked off Freetown in June 1944.

References 

Whaling ships
Ships built on the River Tees
1936 ships